Nadia Neve Colón (born 8 September 2002) is an American-born Dominican footballer who plays as a left back for collegiate team Texas–Rio Grande Valley Vaqueros and the Dominican Republic women's national team.

Early life
Colón was born in Cooper City, Florida and raised in Miami. One of her grandmothers was born in Santo Domingo.

High school and college career
Colón has attended the Archbishop Edward A. McCarthy High School in Southwest Ranches, Florida and the University of Texas Rio Grande Valley.

International career
Colón represented the Dominican Republic at the 2020 CONCACAF Women's U-20 Championship. She made her senior debut on 7 July 2021 in a 0–1 friendly loss to Nicaragua.

References

External links

2002 births
Living people
Citizens of the Dominican Republic through descent
Dominican Republic women's footballers
Women's association football fullbacks
Dominican Republic women's international footballers
Dominican Republic people of European American descent
People from Cooper City, Florida
Sportspeople from Broward County, Florida
Soccer players from Miami
American women's soccer players
UT Rio Grande Valley Vaqueros women's soccer players
American sportspeople of Dominican Republic descent